Czechoslovakian resistance may refer to:

 Czech resistance to Nazi occupation
 Slovak National Uprising
 Prague Spring, 1968 Czech resistance to Soviet domination
 Velvet Revolution, 1989 Czech resistance to Soviet domination